Hortens Avis is a former Norwegian newspaper, based in Horten. It was established in 1874 as Jarlsbergeren, and assumed the name Hortens Avis in 1875. From 1880 Hortens Avis was an organ for the Liberal Party. The newspaper has also called itself Jarlsberg Tidende and Hortens Blad. Among its editors were later Commanding Admiral of Norway Henry Diesen. The newspaper ceased publication in 1926.

References

1874 establishments in Norway
1926 disestablishments in Norway
Defunct newspapers published in Norway
Liberal Party (Norway) newspapers
Mass media in Horten
Norwegian-language newspapers
Publications established in 1874
Publications disestablished in 1926
Newspapers published in Norway